Holly Theatre may refer to:

Holly Theatre (Dahlonega, Georgia)
Holly Theatre (Medford, Oregon)